is a former Japanese football player. He is the current first-team coach fpr J1 League club of Kawasaki Frontale. His younger brother Takayoshi Toda is also a former Japanese footballer.

Playing career
Toda was born in Miyakonojo on September 10, 1977. After graduating from University of Tsukuba, he joined the sport and was promoted to J1 League club, FC Tokyo in 2000. He played many matches as substitute forward from first season. From summer 2002, he became a regular as left midfielder. In 2003, he played in all 40 official matches and scored 11 goals. In 2004, the club won the champions J.League Cup first major title in the club history. However, his opportunity to play decreased in 2006 after breaking his leg before the opening season. In 2007, he moved to Shimizu S-Pulse. Although he also played as right side back, he could not play many matches due to injury in 2 seasons and retired at the end of 2008 season.

Club statistics

References

External links

1977 births
Living people
University of Tsukuba alumni
Association football people from Miyazaki Prefecture
Japanese footballers
J1 League players
FC Tokyo players
Shimizu S-Pulse players
Association football forwards